The 2015–16 season was Charlton Athletic's 94th season in their existence and 4th consecutive season in the second tier of the English football league system. Along with competing in the Championship, the club also participated in the FA Cup and League Cup. The season covered the period from 1 July 2015 to 30 June 2016.

Squad statistics

Appearances and goals

|}

Top scorers

Disciplinary record

Transfers

Transfers in

Transfers out

Total incoming: £3,500,000

Loans in

Loans out

Competitions

Pre-season friendlies
On 18 May 2015, Charlton Athletic announced they would face Welling United in a pre-season friendly on 11 July 2015. On 29 May 2015, the club announced three XI pre-season friendlies. On 1 June 2015, the club announced they will head to Belgium on a pre-season tour and play two games. One confirmed is against Sint Truiden on 18 July 2015. Two days later, Southend United and Dagenham & Redbridge was added to the schedule. On 4 June 2015, a friendly against Genk was announced. Two days later, two home pre-season friendlies were announced. On 12 July 2015, Charlton Athletic announced a replacement friendly against Bolton Wanderers due to A.C. ChievoVerona cancelling friendlies against both teams.

Championship

League table

Results summary

Results by round

Matches
On 17 June 2015, the fixtures for the forthcoming season were announced.

League Cup

On 16 June 2015, the first round draw was made, Charlton Athletic were drawn at home against Dagenham & Redbridge.

FA Cup

Kent Senior Cup
On the Kent FA website the first round details were announced, Charlton Athletic will face Hythe Town.

References

Notes

Charlton Athletic
Charlton Athletic F.C. seasons